The 1984–85 Rugby Football League season was the 90th ever season of professional rugby league football in Britain. Sixteen teams played each other from August, 1984 until May, 1985 for the Slalom Lager Championship. Also these 16 teams plus several more competed for the Challenge Cup.

Season summary
Slalom Lager League Champions: Hull Kingston Rovers
Silk Cut Challenge Cup Winners: Wigan (8 – 28–24 v Hull)
Slalom Lager Premiership Trophy Winners: St. Helens (36–16 v Hull Kingston Rovers at Elland Road, Leeds)
Harry Sunderland Trophy: Harry Pinner
John Player Special Trophy Winners: Hull Kingston Rovers (12–0 v Hull F.C. at Boothferry Park, Hull)
Burtonwood Brewery Lancashire County Cup Winners: St. Helens (26–18 v Wigan at Central Park, Wigan)
2nd Division Champions: Swinton

Aside from retaining the Championship Hull Kingston Rovers won the John Player Special Trophy and reached the finals of both the Premiership and Yorkshire Cup, they were beaten in the Semi-Final of the Challenge Cup meaning they played in every possible game of the season bar one.

On 21 October 1984 Peter Wood kicked a record-equalling five drop goals for Runcorn Highfield in a match against Batley. On October 28, two tries by Mal Meninga inspire St. Helens, to beat Wigan 26–18, and win the Lancashire County Cup for the first time in 16 years.

The 1985 Man of Steel Award went to Bradford Northern utility back, Ellery Hanley. He also became the first man to score more than 50 tries in a season since Billy Boston, and the first non-winger to reach this figure for 70 years.

The increase of the Second Division to 20 teams meant that it would have taken 38 rounds to play out a full double round robin, which was considered too many matches, so a complicated fixture formula was used to reduce it to 28. For this season, Huyton relocated and were renamed Runcorn Highfield, Cardiff City Blue Dragons relocated and were renamed Bridgend Blue Dragons, and Kent Invicta relocated and were renamed were Southend Invicta, Huddersfield were renamed  Huddersfield Barracudas, and Mansfield Marksman, and Sheffield Eagles joined the Second Division. As of 2017, 11th in the Second Division is the lowest position that Wakefield Trinity have ever finished.

St. Helens beat Wigan 26–18 to win the Lancashire County Cup, and Hull F.C. beat Hull Kingston Rovers 29–12 to win the Yorkshire County Cup.

Championship
Hull Kingston Rovers finished on top of the First Division table to claim their fifth championship.

Championship final Standings

Second Division Final Standings

Challenge Cup

The 1984–85 Silk Cut Challenge Cup was won by Wigan after defeating Hull F.C. in the final.

The Final was played on 4 May at Wembley before a crowd of 99,801 and is arguably the greatest ever in Challenge Cup history. Just after half-time Hull were 22 – 8 down before staging a fight back, but Wigan held on to win 28–24, ushering in an era of dominance for the club.

League Cup

Premiership

References

Sources
1984–85 Rugby Football League season at rlhalloffame.org.uk
1984–85 Rugby Football League season at wigan.rlfans.com
Great Britain Competitions 1984–1985 at hunterlink.net.au
1985 Challenge Cup Final at wigan.rlfans.com 

1984 in English rugby league
1985 in English rugby league
Rugby Football League seasons
1984 in Welsh rugby league
1985 in Welsh rugby league